The 1977 German Formula Three Championship was a multi-event motor racing championship for single-seat open wheel formula racing cars held across Europe. The championship featured drivers competing in two-litre Formula Three racing cars which conformed to the technical regulations, or formula, for the championship. It commenced on 27 March at Nürburgring and ended at the same place on 2 October after eight rounds.

Team Obermoser Jörg driver Peter Scharmann became a champion. He won race at Kassel-Calden.  Rudolf Dötsch finished as runner-up, he had three race wins, but he haven't participated in the three races. Heinz Scherle completed the top-three in the drivers' standings with win at Diepholz Airfield Circuit. Bertram Schäfer and Werner Klein were the only other drivers who won a race in the season.

Calendar
All rounds were held in West Germany, excepting Zolder rounds that were held in Belgium.

Championship standings
Points are awarded as follows:

References

External links
 

German Formula Three Championship seasons
Formula Three season